Samalpatti railway station is located in Krishnagiri District, Tamil Nadu. It is the nearest railway station to Uthangarai and around villages.

References

Railway stations in Krishnagiri district